A Black Fast, also known as a strict fast, is an ancient form of Christian fasting. Those undertaking a Black Fast consume no food during the day (although sometimes water is permitted) and then break the fast after sunset with prayer, as well as a meal devoid of meat, eggs, dairy products, and alcohol. Historically, many Christians fasted in this way during Lent. Many monastics still retain this practice which is optional for others.

Description and practice
Traditionally, the Black Fast is undertaken during Lent; it is the early Christian form of fasting consisting of "eating only once a day, toward evening; nothing else except a little water was taken all day". This was the normative way of Christian fasting prior to the 8th century A.D. and in some localities, such as in India and Pakistan, many Christians continue observing the Black Fast on Ash Wednesday and Good Friday, with some fasting in this manner throughout the whole season of Lent. After attending a worship service  (often on Wednesday or Friday evenings), it is common for Christians of various denominations to break that day's Lenten fast together through a communal Lenten supper, which is held in the church's parish hall in the public setting; in the home setting Lenten Suppers take place in the context of a family meal everyday during Lent (except on the Lord's Day). Throughout the entire Christian year, many Christians keep the Black Fast on Wednesdays (in memory of Jesus' betrayal) and on Fridays (to mourn the crucifixion of Jesus).

The details of the Black Fast are as follows:

 No more than one meal per day is permitted.
 Flesh meat, eggs, and white meats (lacticinia: milk, butter, and cheese) are forbidden.
 Alcohol is forbidden.
 The meal is not allowed until after sunset.
A mealtime prayer is offered at the time the Black Fast is broken.
 During Holy Week (the final week of Lent), the Lenten supper meal consists exclusively of bread, salt, herbs, and water.

Roman Catholicism
The Black Fast was widely practiced by the faithful during the Lenten season by "kings and princes, clergy and laity, rich and poor". In addition, the Black Fast was kept on the days preceding one's ordination. When fasting today, Roman Catholics have the liberty to fast in this manner, or in the modern fashion in which a collation is permitted.
Fasting rules were liberalised to avoid accidents due to weakness or lack of concentration in modern industrial jobs. For the same reason some soldiers in military orders like the Hospitaliers were historically exempt from the strict rule.

Eastern Orthodoxy and Eastern Catholicism
Some Eastern Catholics perform the Black Fast on Fridays during Lent, especially on Good Friday.

The Black Fast is observed by the devout Eastern Orthodox Christians or monks throughout Great Lent, as well as the three other fasting periods of the year (the Dormition Fast, Nativity Fast, and the Apostles' Fast).

Romanian Orthodox Church
The term "Black Fast" has a different connotation within the Romanian Orthodox Church, which defines it somewhat similar to the definition given by those within the realms of the Classical Pentecostal movement .

Anglican Communion
In Anglican Communion, the faithful have observed the Black Fast on "the two great Prayer Book fast days, Ash Wednesday and Good Friday". The Black Fast was especially popular during the 19th century as it sought to imitate "the fasting of the ancient church."

Pentecostal movement
The term "Black Fast" has a different connotation with writers within Classical Pentecostalism. A Black Fast is complete abstinence from food or water and nothing is consumed in its duration. Dr. Curtis Ward teaches that the Black Fast should never extend beyond three days because of ketosis, possible kidney damage, and dehydration. He further states that nothing in the New Testament says that they extended this type of fast beyond that limitation and that Christ's fast included water because "he was afterward an hungred" and was offered bread. If he had abstained from water he would have obviously craved water first and foremost. Dr. Ward states that the Black Fast, Hebrew Fast, and the Absolute Fast are synonymous terms.

The former Arthur Wallis coined the term "Absolute Fast" in 1968 in his book "God's Chosen Fast." A Normal Fast or "Complete Fast" consists of eating nothing but drinking pure water. A Partial Fast (or Daniel Fast) consists of eliminating all but one type of food or eliminating just one type of food. The Black Fast is observed on rare occasions in Pentecostal circles while the Normal Fast is most usually undertaken.

References 

Christian fasting
Catholic spirituality
Lent